This is a list of journalism schools in Europe.

Albania
 Instituti Shqiptar i Medias (Albanian Media Institute) - Tirana

Armenia
 Russian-Armenian (Slavonic) University Faculty of Journalism - Yerevan
 Yerevan State Linguistic University Department of Linguistics and Intercultural Communication - Yerevan
 Yerevan State University Department of Journalism - Yerevan

Austria
 Center for Journalism and Communication Management, Danube University - Krems
 fjum_forum journalismus und medien - Vienna
 Kuratorium für Journalistenausbildung - Salzburg
 South East and Central Europe PR Organisation - SECEPRO Master Programme - Vienna

Azerbaijan
 Baku Slavic University
 Department of Journalism Khazar University - Baku

Belgium

French Community of Belgium 

 UCLouvain, Louvain School of Journalism - Louvain-la-Neuve and Mons
 University of Liège (ULiège), Department of Media, Culture and Communication - Liège
 IHECS Brussels School of Journalism (Institut des hautes études des communications sociales) - Brussels
 Saint-Louis University, Brussels (UCLouvain) - Brussels

Flemish Community of Belgium 

AP Hogeschool - Antwerp
 Artevelde Hogeschool - Ghent
Erasmushogeschool - Brussels
 Institute XIOS Hogeschool - Limburg
 Thomas More - Antwerpen

Bulgaria
 Sofia University - Sofia
 Department of Media and Public Communications, University of National and World Economy - Sofia

Denmark
 Centre for Journalism, Department of Political Science, University of Southern Denmark - Odense
 Institute Danish School of Media and Journalism - Aarhus & Copenhagen

Estonia
 Tallinn University - Tallinn
 University of Tartu - Tartu

Finland
 Haaga-Helia University of Applied Sciences - Helsinki
 Institute University of Helsinki - Helsinki
 University of Jyvaskyla - Jyvaskyla
 University of Tampere - Tampere
 The Voionmaa Institute - Ylöjärvi
Åbo Akademi University - Turku
University of Turku - Turku

France

University schools 
Master in Journalism - Centre universitaire d'enseignement du journalisme (CUEJ) - Strasbourg
 Bachelor in Journalism - Lannion Institute of Technology (IUT), University of Rennes - Lannion
Bachelor in Journalism - École de Journalisme de Cannes (EJC), Côte d'Azur University - Cannes
 Centre d'Études Littéraires et Scientifiques Appliquées (CELSA), Sorbonne University - Paris
École de Journalisme et de Communication d'Aix-Marseille (EJCAM), Aix-Marseille University - Marseille
 École du Journalisme de Nice - Nice, France
École Publique de Journalisme de Tours (EPJT), University of Tours - Tours
École de Journalisme de Grenoble (EJDG), Grenoble Alpes University - Grenoble
Master in Journalism, Paris Institute of Political Science - Paris
 Institut de Journalisme Bordeaux-Aquitaine (IJBA), Bordeaux Montaigne University - Bordeaux
 Institut Français de Presse (IFP), Panthéon-Assas University - Paris
 Institut Pratique de Journalisme (IPJ), PSL University - Paris

Independent schools 

Centre de Formation des Journalistes (CFJ), Paris-based Journalism School - Paris
 École Supérieure de Journalisme de Lille (ESJ) - Lille
École Supérieure de Journalisme de Montpellier (ESJ PRO) - Montpellier
École de Journalisme de Toulouse (EJT) - Toulouse
École Française de Journalisme (EFJ) - Bordeaux

Georgia
 Georgian Institute of Public Affairs, Caucasus School of Journalism and Media Management - Tbilisi
 Teimuraz Paperashvili T.V.-creative studio-Grigol Robakidze University-Tbilisi

Germany
 Deutsche Journalistenschule - Munich
 Freie Journalistenschule - Berlin
 Henri-Nannen-Schule - Hamburg 
 Hochschule Bonn-Rhein-Sieg University for Applied Sciences - Sankt Augustin
 Jade University of Applied Sciences Institute for Media Management and Journalism - Wilhelmshaven
 Kölner Journalistenschule für Politik und Wirtschaft - Köln
 Macromedia University of Applied Sciences for Media and Communication - Munich, Stuttgart, Cologne, Hamburg and Berlin 
 MedienQualifizierung GmbH - Akademie für Hörfunk und Medien - Köln
 Universität Leipzig, Institut für Journalistik - Leipzig

Greece
 Aristotle University of Thessaloniki (AUTh) School of Journalism and Mass Communications - Thessaloniki  - MA in Digital Media, Communication and Journalism (1 year, 90 ECTS, English language)

The MA program offers the following three distinct pathways: 
 Digital Media, Culture and Communication 
 European Journalism 
 Risk Communication and Crisis Journalism

Hungary
 Bálint György Academy of Journalism, National Association of Hungarian Journalists - Budapest
 Budapest Metropolitan University - Budapest

Ireland
 Dublin Institute of Technology - Dublin
 NUI Galway - Galway

Italy
 Catholic University of Milan (Università Cattolica del Sacro Cuore) - Milan
 Master universitario in Giornalismo, IULM University of Milan - Milano
 Scuola di Giornalismo Radiotelevisivo di Perugia (Rai, Radiotelevisione Italiana) - Perugia
 Scuola Superiore di Giornalismo "Massimo Baldini" - LUISS Guido Carli - Rome

Lithuania
 University of Vilnius - Vilnius

North Macedonia 
 School of Journalism and Public Relations - Skopje

Netherlands
 Christelijke Hogeschool - Ede
 Department of Journalism, University of Groningen - Groningen
 Fontys Hogeschool Journalistiek - Tilburg
 European Journalism Centre - Maastricht
 Hogeschool Windesheim (Windesheim University of Applied Science) - Zwolle
 School voor Journalistiek, Hogeschool Utrecht - Utrecht

Norway
 Oslo and Akershus University College of Applied Sciences - Oslo

Poland
 Institute of Media Education and Journalism - Faculty of Theology - University of Cardinal Stefan Wyszyński - Warsaw

Portugal
 Autónoma University - Lisbon
 CENJOR - Centre for Training in Journalism - Lisbon
 Lisbon Polytechnic Institute - Superior School of Communications - Lisbon
 Lisbon University Institute - IUL  - Lisbon 
 Nova University of Lisbon - Faculty of Human and Social Sciences - Lisbon
 Portuguese Catholic University - Lisbon
 University of Beiras - Covilhã
 University of Coimbra - Faculty of Letters/ Journalism Institute - Coimbra
 University of Minho - Braga 
 University of Oporto - Faculty of Letters - Oporto

Romania
 Babeș-Bolyai University - Babeș-Bolyai

Russia
 Department of Mass Communication of the Institute of Humanities of the Novosibirsk State University, Novosibirsk
 Faculty of Journalism, Humanities Institute of TV & Radio Broadcasting named after M.A. Litovchin, Moscow
 Faculty of Journalism of the International University in Moscow, Moscow
 Faculty of Journalism of the Moscow State University named after M.V. Lomonosov, Moscow
 Higher School of Journalism and Mass Communication of the Saint Petersburg State University, Saint Petersburg
 Vladimir Mezentsev school of journalism of the Central House of Journalists, Moscow

Serbia
 Department of Journalism, University of Philosophy - Novi Sad
 International Media Center (Portoroz-Ljubljana-Vienna-Belgrade)

Spain
 Autonoma University of Barcelona - Barcelone
 Autonoma University of Madrid - El País School of Journalism - Madrid
 Carlos III University of Madrid (Getafe) - Madrid
 Complutense University of Madrid - Faculty of Communications - Madrid
 Escuela de Periodismo UAM - El País - Madrid
 IE School of Communication, Master in Digital Journalism - Madrid
 Mondragon University (HUHEZI) - Eskoriatza-Gipuzkoa
 Navarra University - Pamplona 
 Rey Juan Carlos University of Madrid - EFE News Agency School - Madrid
 San Pablo University CEU - El Mundo Newspaper group  - San Pablo
 University of Barcelona - Barcelone
 University of the Basque Country - Bilbao
 University of Castilla-La Mancha - Faculty of Journalism - Cuenca
 University of Seville  - Seville
 University of Santiago de Compostela  - Santiago de Compostela
 University of Valencia - Valencia

Sweden
 Göteborgs Universitet - Göteborgs
 Linnaeus University - Kalmar
 Södertörn University - Huddinge
 University of Stockholm - Stockholm

Switzerland
 MAZ - Die Schweizer Journalistenschule - Luzern
 University of Neuchâtel (AJM Académie du journalisme et des médias) - Neuchâtel
 Zurich University of Applied Sciences (IAM Institute of Applied Media Studies) - Winterthur

Turkey
 Anadolu University - Eskişehir
 Cumhuriyet University - Sivas
 Erciyes University - Kayseri
 Istanbul University - Istanbul
 Istanbul Bilgi University - Istanbul
 Istanbul Medipol University - Istanbul
 Nişantaşı University - Istanbul

Ukraine
 Institute of Journalism Taras Shevchenko National University of Kyiv
 Ivan Franko National University of Lviv
 Kyiv International University
 Mohyla School of Journalism (National University Kyiv-Mohyla Academy)
 The National University of Ostroh Academy - Ostroh
 Sumy State University
 Ukrainian Catholic University - Lviv

United Kingdom

England
 Birmingham School of Media at Birmingham City University
 Bristol, University of the West of England
 Brunel University
 Goldsmiths, University of London
 City University - London
 Coventry University
 Department of English, University of Buckingham
 Department of Media, University of Chester
 Department of Journalism, University of Sheffield
 Department of Media, Culture and Language, University of Roehampton
 Faculty of Arts, University of Brighton
 Falmouth University
 Leeds Business School, Leeds Metropolitan University
 Leeds Trinity Centre for Journalism, Leeds Trinity University
 Leicester Centre for Journalism, De Montfort University
 London College of Communication, University of the Arts London
 London College of Fashion, University of the Arts London
 London Metropolitan University
 London School of Journalism
 Media School, Bournemouth University 
 Middlesex University
 Nottingham Trent University
 School of Arts & Media - Media & Journalism, Teesside University
 School of Humanities, University of Hertfordshire
 School of Journalism & Digital Communication, University of Central Lancashire
 School of Social, Historical and Literary Studies, University of Portsmouth
 University of Lincoln
 University of Westminster

Scotland
 Aberdeen College
 Adam Smith College
 City of Glasgow College
 Department of Communication, Media and Marketing, Robert Gordon University
 Edinburgh Napier University
 Glasgow Caledonian University
 University of Stirling
 University of Strathclyde
 University of the West of Scotland

Wales
 Bangor University
 Cardiff University
 Glyndwr University
 Swansea Metropolitan (UWTSD)
 University of South Wales

Northern Ireland
 Belfast Metropolitan College
 North West Regional College
 Southern Regional College
 University of Ulster

References

Journalism lists
Education in Europe
Journalism schools